Isaac Henry (born 8 March 1999) is an Australian rugby union player who plays for the  in Super Rugby. His playing position is centre. He was named in the Reds squad for the 2021 Super Rugby AU season.

Reference list

External links
Rugby.com.au profile
itsrugby.co.uk profile

1999 births
Australian rugby union players
Living people
Rugby union centres
Brisbane City (rugby union) players
Queensland Reds players